Little Bačka Canal (Serbian: Мали бачки канал/Mali bački kanal), (Hungarian: Ferenc József-csatorna) is a canal in Serbia which runs from Mali Stapar (on Great Bačka Canal) to Novi Sad (on Danube). The canal is 66 km long and it is part of Danube-Tisa-Danube Canal system. The canal shortens waterway from Bezdan to Novi Sad by 75 km. Little Bačka Canal has 4 sluices. In the past, the canal was named after emperor Franz Josef (during Austrian rule) and king Alexander (during Kingdom of Yugoslavia).

See also
Great Bačka Canal
Danube-Tisa-Danube Canal

Geography of Vojvodina
Canals in Serbia
Bačka
Canals opened in 1875